Westwind is a 2011 German comedy film directed by Robert Thalheim.

Cast 
 Friederike Becht as Doreen
 Luise Heyer as Isabel
  as Arne
 Volker Bruch as Nico
 Hans-Uwe Bauer as Balisch
  as Klaus
 Albrecht Schuch as Ronny

References

External links 

2011 comedy films
2011 films
German comedy films
2010s German-language films
2010s German films
Films set in East Germany
Films set in Hungary
Films set in 1988
Rowing films